Sy is a village of Wallonia in the municipality of Ferrières, district of Vieuxville, located in the province of liège, Belgium. 

It is located in the Famenne and lays south of the city of Liège in the Belgian Ardennes near the Ourthe. This is also the village where Belgian painter  (1871-1929) made some of his paintings and later died.

Tourism 
Due to the village's close location to the Ourthe river, river tourism has become the most precious income to Sy. The village has a train station which runs along line 43. Most of its tourism comes from sport activities by the river such as canoeing, but hikes and climbing are also popular activities.

References

 
Populated places in Liège Province